Plavecký Štvrtok is a village and municipality in western Slovakia in  Malacky District in the Bratislava region.

Etymology
Štvrtok means in Slovak Thursday and it indicates that the settlement held a market on Thursdays. The attribute Plavecký comes from the name of Plavecký Castle estate (the castle is named after Cumans, in Slovak Plavci).

Landmarks
Saint Mission Church Plavecký Štvrtok

References

External links
Official website

Villages and municipalities in Malacky District